Doctor, You've Got to Be Kidding! is a 1967 American comedy film directed by Peter Tewksbury and starring Sandra Dee, George Hamilton and Celeste Holm.

Plot
Heather Halloran, pursued by three men who want to marry her, is about to give birth. The events that led to her pregnancy are recalled. Her mother wants Heather to be a singing star but she works as a secretary for the rich Harlan Wycliff. She falls in love with Wycliff, but he wants her to abandon her budding career as a singer.

Cast
 Sandra Dee as Heather Halloran
 George Hamilton as Harlan W. Wycliff
 Celeste Holm as Louise Halloran
 Bill Bixby as Dick Bender
 Dwayne Hickman as Hank Judson
 Dick Kallman as Pat Murad
 Mort Sahl as Dan Ruskin

Production
The film is based on the 1965 debut novel Three for the Wedding by writer Patte Lee Mahan, which the Los Angeles Times called "a highly entertaining and amusing book." Trident Productions, a company established by director Delbert Mann, producer Douglas Laurence and writer Dale Wasserman, bought the film rights. Mahan agreed to write the screenplay and Charles Walters was originally slated to direct.

The film was originally entitled Three for the Wedding, then This Way Out, Please before its final title of Doctor, You've Got to Be Kidding!.

Sandra Dee selected the role of Heather instead of a part in a film shooting in London with Warren Beatty. This was Dee's first film after leaving Universal Studios, where she been under exclusive contract for ten years. She hoped the role would assist in her transition to more mature screen roles.

George Hamilton was in a highly publicized romance at the time with Lynda Bird, daughter of president Lyndon Johnson.

Doctor, You've Got to Be Kidding! marked Celeste Holm's first film since Bachelor Flat (1961). She said: "It's kind of an Italian comedy set in Glendale. Like most Italian comedies, it's based on a tragic truth. When the film opens, a young girl is unmarried and pregnant."

Reception
After the film was previewed, MGM commissioned Phillip Shuken to write a sequel to star Hamilton and Dee, but the sequel did not materialize.

References

External links
 
 Doctor, You've Got to Be Kidding! at TCM
 
 
 Film information at Sandra Dee Fans
 

1967 films
1967 romantic comedy films
American pregnancy films
American romantic comedy films
Films about singers
Films based on American novels
Films directed by Peter Tewksbury
Films scored by Kenyon Hopkins
Metro-Goldwyn-Mayer films
1960s English-language films
1960s American films